The Manhattan Waterfront Greenway is a waterfront greenway for walking or cycling,  long, around the island of Manhattan, in New York City. The largest portions are operated by the New York City Department of Parks and Recreation. It is separated from motor traffic, and many sections also separate pedestrians from cyclists.  There are three principal parts — the East, Harlem and Hudson River Greenways.

Components

Hudson River Greenway

The Hudson River Greenway is the longest greenway in Manhattan, running along the West Side, from Battery Park in the south -- mostly through Hudson River Park, Riverside Park, and Fort Washington Park -- to Dyckman Street in the north.

A gap in West Harlem was filled in early October 2008 with the opening of the Harlem Piers bike lane.  A roughly 10-block detour in the west 80s, where a walkway had crumbled into the river in the late 20th century, was eliminated on May 20, 2010, when the rebuilt section of greenway was opened.

The Hudson River Greenway is the most heavily used bikeway in the United States. The Hudson River Greenway is part of the East Coast Greenway, a  trail system connecting Maine to Florida, and is also part of the statewide Empire State Trail, forming its southernmost portion.

At the downtown end, the Battery Bikeway connects the Hudson and East River Greenways via the Battery and Peter Minuit Plaza. It opened in 2015 after renovation work on the South Ferry/Whitehall Street station. The connection is a biker crossing right of way across Battery Place to the foot of the Hudson River Greenway.  At the Battery's southeast end, the bikeway continues as the East River Greenway, which runs next to FDR Drive.

Travelers to Brooklyn use a bike lane in Warren Street and a one-way bike path (opened in September 2008) through the north end of City Hall Park to connect to the Brooklyn Bridge.  Those arriving from Brooklyn use lanes in Park Row and Murray Street to reach the Greenway.

Mixed-use paths continue a mile north from Dyckman Street into Inwood Hill Park alongside the western ball fields, at which point the path crosses the Amtrak rail tracks using a bridge with steps.  This continues northeast into the park as part of the park trail system and connects north to bikeways in Spuyten Duyvil in the Bronx via the Henry Hudson Bridge, and east to the bike lane on 218th Street leading to the Broadway Bridge.

The Harbor Ring is an initiative to create a  bike route along the Lower Hudson River, Upper New York Bay, and Kill van Kull that would incorporate bike paths along the Greenway.

A portion of the Greenway between 72nd and 83rd Street is devoted to just pedestrians and the bike path was redirected onto other paths, including part of the roundabout above the 79th Street Boat Basin.

An attack on the Greenway on October 31, 2017 killed six tourists and two local people; the perpetrator was an Uzbek-American and he used a Home Depot truck in the attacks.

East River Greenway

The East River Greenway runs along the East Side, from Battery Park and past South Street Seaport to a dead end at 125th Street, East Harlem with a  gap from 34th to 60th streets in Midtown where pedestrians use busy First and Second Avenues to get around United Nations Headquarters between the Upper East Side and Kips Bay portions of the Greenway.

Some places are narrow due to sinkholes being blocked off by protective fencing, and the Captain Patrick J. Brown Walk squeezes between the highway and the dock of Con Edison's East River Station, requiring slower speeds.  Other parts are shared space with motor access to Waterside Plaza (at Stuyvesant Cove Park), or a filling station. Approximately a mile near the southwest end is in the shadow of the elevated FDR Drive. This part is to be improved by the East River Esplanade project.

In the summer of 2008 the East River Greenway, along with the Brooklyn Heights Promenade, provided viewing locations to see the New York City Waterfalls.

In October 2011, the city and state reached an agreement to use the western portion of Robert Moses Playground for an expansion of the United Nations campus.  In exchange, the United Nations Development Corporation would pay $73 million to fund the development of the gap in the Greenway between 38th and 60th streets. In April 2017, the city committed $100 million in funding toward building this part of the greenway.

Harlem River Greenway

Partially following the route of the old Harlem River Speedway, the Harlem River Greenway is the shortest portion of the Manhattan Waterfront Greenway and is completely uninterrupted, running north  through lower Highbridge Park from 155th Street, at the north end of Harlem, to Dyckman Street in northern Manhattan. It lies between the Harlem River and Harlem River Drive. Users of the East River Greenway must use ordinary streets through East Harlem to reach this portion.  A bike lane in Dyckman Street through Inwood connects to Inwood Hill Park and the Hudson River Greenway via a 2015 bike ramp at the western end of Dyckman Street.

A second, shorter Harlem River Greenway is in Harlem River Park, running from about 133rd Street in the south to 145th Street in the north. Access to the greenway is via walkways at 135th, 139th, and 142nd streets. The city has proposed to extend Harlem River Park south to 125th Street, where the greenway could connect to the East River Greenway.

Storm barrier

The final proposal, which is geographically U-shaped, will include many features. Under the elevated FDR Drive structure above South Street will be storm barriers hanging from the viaduct's ceiling, which will drop down in case of a storm. A "Battery Berm" will be located at Battery Park, and a maritime museum will be opened on the site of a former Coast Guard building there. The proposal, by Rebuild by Design, will also include components for storm barriers in Hunts Point, Bronx and on Staten Island.

The first component, a  barrier on the Lower East Side between Montgomery and East 13th Streets called "The Bridging Berm", will cost $335 million. In addition to storm protection, the berm—the first of three of the barrier's components—will also provide a pedestrian pathway and bikeway on top of berm, boating and fishing docks, a slope down to current sports fields, upgraded ADA-accessible ramps for bridges across the FDR Drive, and construction materials such as "slurry walls, concrete blocks, a compacted embankment, a clay cap, topsoil and salt-tolerant landscaping."  The berm bikeway will make a second connection between the Hudson and East River Greenways (the first being the Battery Bikeway).  The total cost of the project is over $3.5 billion.

In March 2019, mayor Bill de Blasio announced a Lower Manhattan Coastal Resiliency Plan, which would create barriers and possibly extend the shoreline at a cost of $10 billion. At the time, four of the project's phases had funding and were set to start construction between 2020 and 2021. The projects include berms as well as retractable dams and barriers in Battery Park City, the Financial District, and Two Bridges. In 2019, the city installed a temporary barrier while the permanent barrier is being erected.

See also 
Cycling in New York City
Brooklyn-Queens Greenway
Greenway (landscape)

References 
Notes

External links

Manhattan Waterfront Greenway Bike Map
East River Greenway:

 
Cycling in New York City
Bike paths in New York City
Transportation in Manhattan
Port of New York and New Jersey
Redeveloped ports and waterfronts in the United States
Parks in Manhattan
Hudson River Park
Harlem River
Hudson River
Greenways in New York City
Waterfronts
Hiking trails in New York City